Skeleton was inducted at the Youth Olympic Games at the inaugural edition in 2012.

A total of two events are held, one event each for boys and girls, matching their Winter Olympics counterpart.

Medalists summary

Boys'

Girls'

Medal table
As of the 2016 Winter Youth Olympics.

See also
Skeleton at the Winter Olympics

References

 
Youth Olympics
Sports at the Winter Youth Olympics